Luigi Rovere (June 30, 1908 – October 20, 1996) was an Italian film producer.

Selected filmography

 How I Lost the War (1947)
 Bullet for Stefano (1947)
 L'eroe della strada (1948)
 In the Name of the Law (1949)
 How I Discovered America (1949)
 Path of Hope (1950)
 Il monello della strada (1950)
 Napoleon (1951)
 Shadows on the Grand Canal (1951)
 Il bivio (1951)
 Lorenzaccio (1951)
 Behind Closed Shutters (1951)
 The Bandit of Tacca Del Lupo (1952)
 The White Sheik (1952)
 Puccini (1953)
 Symphony of Love (1954)
 Rommel's Treasure (1955)
 We Stole a Tram (1956)
 Account Rendered (1957)
 Toto and Marcellino (1958)
 Night Train to Milan (1962)
 Agostino (1962)
 Terror of the Steppes (1964)
 Hercules of the Desert (1964)
 Giant of the Lost Tomb (1964)
 Desert Raiders (1964)
 Imperfect Murder (1966)
 Me, Me, Me... and the Others (1966)
 Man, Pride and Vengeance (1967)
 I Protect Myself Against My Enemies (1969)
 A Sword for Brando (1970)
 Ma chi t'ha dato la patente? (1970)
 Armiamoci e partite! (1971)
 Don Camillo e i giovani d'oggi (1972)
 City Under Siege (1974)
 Due sul pianerottolo (1976)
 The Black Corsair (1976)

References

Bibliography
 Tullio Kezich. Federico Fellini: His Life and Work. I.B.Tauris, 2007.

External links

1908 births
1996 deaths
Italian film producers